Ringley Road railway station was a railway station built on the Manchester, Bury and Rossendale Railway line, between Radcliffe and Clifton (formerly Clifton Junction), in Greater Manchester.

History
The railway station was opened on 31 May 1847 but in a remote location, and was little used. The western platform was accessed by a pathway down from Ringley Road, the east platform was accessed by a subway at the southern end of the station.

In 1879 the railway station was the location of the apparent suicide of a collier who had been in the custody of a police officer for assaulting his wife. The collier had jumped in front of an approaching train and was crushed to death, almost dragging the officer along with him. A later inquest in Salford returned an open verdict.

The railway station closed on 5 January 1953.  The railway station now forms part of the route of the Irwell Sculpture Trail.

References

Bibliography 

Disused railway stations in the Metropolitan Borough of Bury
Former Lancashire and Yorkshire Railway stations
Railway stations in Great Britain opened in 1847
Railway stations in Great Britain closed in 1953
1847 establishments in England